Alleged (4 May 1974 – 23 June 2000) was an American-bred, Irish-trained Thoroughbred racehorse and sire. He is best known for winning the Prix de l'Arc de Triomphe in 1977 and 1978. One of the outstanding racehorses of the twentieth century, he was only beaten once in his career.

Background
Alleged was a bay horse bred by June McKnight. He was sold twice as a young horse, being sold for $34,000 as a yearling and $175,000 as a two-year-old. On the second occasion he was bought by Robert Sangster and his associates and sent to be trained in Europe. He ran originally in the colours of Robert Fluor before being transferred to Sangster's colours towards the end of his 3-year-old career. According to Sangster, the original intention was to race Alleged in California, but it was felt that the colt's forelegs would not stand up to the stresses of American racing. Alleged was trained at Ballydoyle, in Ireland by Vincent O'Brien.

Racing career
Alleged did not appear on a racecourse until November 1976, when he won the  7-furlong Donnelly's Hollow Maiden Stakes by 8 lengths at the Curragh.

As a three-year-old he won the Ballydoyle Stakes at Leopardstown Racecourse in April in workmanlike style but then created a 33/1 upset by winning the Royal Whip Stakes at the Curragh, beating his stable companion Valinsky who started favourite as well as the previous year's Irish St Leger winner, Meneval. Alleged then won the Gallinule Stakes and was originally scheduled to run in the Irish Derby, but Vincent O'Brien decided to run Epsom Derby winner The Minstrel instead and rested Alleged until August when he outclassed a strong field in the Great Voltigeur Stakes at York. Alleged started favourite for the St. Leger Stakes, but finished second to Dunfermline. Many observers felt that jockey Lester Piggott erred in taking on Dunfermline's two pacemakers throughout the race rather than conserving Alleged's stamina and using his superior finishing speed. In the 1977 Prix de l'Arc de Triomphe, Alleged led for most of the way and won readily by one and a half lengths from Balmerino, easily reversing placings with Dunfermline who finished fourth.

At four, Alleged was unbeaten in three races. He won the Royal Whip Stakes again, but then missed the summer due to sore shins followed by a virus. He returned in the autumn to win the Prix du Prince d'Orange at Longchamp, breaking the course record for 10 furlongs. He then won his second Arc, winning by two lengths from the fillies Trillion and Dancing Maid.

Assessment
In the inaugural International Classification, a collaboration between the official handicappers of Britain, France and Ireland, Alleged was rated the best European horse of 1977 with a rating of 138. He was again rated the best European horse in 1978 with a rating of 140.

Alleged was given a Timeform rating of 137 in 1977 and 138 in 1978. In both seasons, he was the organisation's highest rated horse.

Stud record
Retired after the 1978 racing season, Alleged was syndicated for $16 million  and stood at stud at Walmac International near Lexington, Kentucky. He sired a number of champions. Among them were Miss Alleged, Midway Lady, Shantou, Flemensfirth, Legal Case, Law Society, Leading Counsel and Strategic Choice. Alleged is the grandsire of 2005 Grand National winner, Hedgehunter and damsire of 2010 winner, Don't Push It.

Alleged was pensioned in 1998 and died on 23 June 2000 from the infirmities of old age. He is buried at Walmac International.

Pedigree

See also
List of leading Thoroughbred racehorses

References

1974 racehorse births
2000 racehorse deaths
Racehorses bred in Kentucky
Racehorses trained in Ireland
Arc winners
European Thoroughbred Horse of the Year
Thoroughbred family 2-s